Frank Thompson (1918–1989) was an American politician.

Frank Thompson may also refer to:
Sarah Emma Edmonds (1841–1898), Canadian-American woman who served with the Union Army as Frank Thompson during the American Civil War
Frank Thompson (outfielder) (1852–1925), Portuguese baseball player; born Augustus Fernandez
Frank V. Thompson (1874–1921), American educator
Frank D. Thompson (1876–1940), Justice of the Vermont Supreme Court
Frank Thompson (footballer) (1885–1950), Irish football player and manager
Frank Thompson (coach) (1886–1918), American football and baseball player and coach
Frank Thompson (third baseman) (1895–1940), American baseball player
Francis Roy Thompson (1896–1966), Australian artist whose work was first exhibited at the New Gallery of Fine Art in Adelaide, also known as Frank Roy or F. R. Thompson
Frank Thompson (pitcher) (1918–1983), American baseball player
Frank Thompson (SOE officer) (1920–1944), British officer during World War II
Frank Thompson (designer) (1920–1977), American costume designer
Frank Tsosie Thompson (1920–2008), American Navajo code talker during World War II
Frank Thompson (sport shooter) (born 1988), American Olympian in skeet shooting

See also
Francis Thompson (disambiguation)
Frank Thomson (disambiguation)